Kim Maiden Simmonds (5 December 1947 – 13 December 2022) was a Welsh musician. He was the founder, guitarist, primary songwriter and sole consistent member of the blues rock band Savoy Brown. Simmonds led Savoy Brown since its inception in 1965, and he appeared on every Savoy Brown release.

Career
When still a young teenager, Simmonds learned to play from listening to his brother's blues records. Considered one of the architects of British blues, he started the Savoy Brown Blues Band in October 1965, who began playing gigs at the Nags Head in 1966 in London. Early gigs included performing with Cream at Klooks Kleek and accompanying John Lee Hooker.

Live performances led to Savoy Brown signing with Decca. But it was 1969 before its classic line-up gelled around Simmonds, rhythm guitarist Lonesome Dave Peverett, and the monocle and bowler hat-wearing vocalist Chris Youlden. That year's Blue Matter and A Step Further albums conjured up at least three classics heard on The Best of Savoy Brown (20th Century Masters/The Millennium Collection): "Train To Nowhere", the live show-stopper "Louisiana Blues" (a Muddy Waters number), and "I'm Tired".

Since its first US visit, Savoy Brown has criss-crossed the country, and "I'm Tired" became the group's first hit single across the ocean. The band would find a greater following in America than in its native England throughout its career.

1970's Raw Sienna followed, featuring "A Hard Way To Go" and "Stay While The Night Is Still Young". When Youlden then departed for a solo career, Lonesome Dave took over the lead vocals. Looking In, also in 1970, featured not only "Poor Girl" and "Money Can't Save Your Soul" but one of the era's memorable LP covers, a troglodyte-like savage staring into an eye socket of a monstrous skull. Later, Peverett, bassist Tony Stevens and drummer Roger Earl left to form the successful but decidedly rock band Foghat. Simmonds soldiered on, recruiting from blues band Chicken Shack keyboardist Paul Raymond, bassist Andy Silvester and drummer Dave Bidwell, and from the Birmingham club circuit the vocalist Dave Walker.

The new line-up was a hit. On stage in America, the group was supported by Rod Stewart and the Faces. On the album Street Corner Talking (1971) and Hellbound Train (1972) launched favourites "Tell Mama", "Street Corner Talking", a cover of the Temptations' Motown standard "I Can't Get Next To You" and the nine-minute epic "Hellbound Train" (decades later Love and Rockets adapted it as "Bound For Hell"). Walker then quit to join Fleetwood Mac, pre-Buckingham/Nicks.

In 1997, Simmonds released his first solo acoustic album, entitled Solitaire. He toured worldwide with various configurations of Savoy Brown. The 2004 live set You Should Have Been There, recorded in early 2003 in Vancouver with Simmonds handling lead vocals – and also as a solo acoustic act. In 2011 he celebrated 45 years of touring with the Savoy Brown album Voodoo Moon.

In 2017, his album with Savoy Brown, Witchy Feeling, reached number one on the Billboard blues charts.

As a soloist and leader of Savoy Brown, Simmonds released over 47 albums through 2016. He was also a painter; the cover of his 2008 solo release, Out of the Blue, featured his original art.
In 2008, Simmonds appeared in the Rockumentary "American Music: OFF THE RECORD", Dir. by Benjamin Meade of Cosmic Cowboy Studio in Fayetteville, Arkansas, alongside Jackson Browne, Noam Chomsky, Douglas Rushkoff, Les Paul, Johnny and Edgar Winter and countless other musicians and musical acts.

Health and death
On 15 August 2022, Simmonds announced via the Savoy Brown website that he had been receiving chemotherapy for stage four colon cancer. Due to the side effects of his treatment, all scheduled performances were cancelled. Simmonds died of the disease on 13 December 2022 in Syracuse, New York, at age 75. The news was announced via the Savoy Brown fanpage on 15 December.

Discography

with Savoy Brown

 Shake Down (1967)
 Getting to the Point (1968)
 Blue Matter (1969)
 A Step Further (1969)
 Raw Sienna (1970)
 Looking In (1970)
 Street Corner Talking (1971)
 Hellbound Train (1972)
 Lion's Share (1972)
 Jack the Toad (1973)
 Boogie Brothers (1974)
 Wire Fire (1975)
 Skin 'n' Bone (1976)
 Savage Return (1978)
 Rock 'n' Roll Warriors (1981)
 Slow Train (1986)
 Make Me Sweat (1988)
 Kings of Boogie (1989)
 Let It Ride (1992)
 Bring It Home (1994)
 The Blues Keep Me Holding On (1999)
 Strange Dreams (2003)
 You Should Have Been There! (2004)
 Blues, Balls, & Boogie (Australia 2005)
 Steel (2007)
 Train to Nowhere (2010)
 Voodoo Moon (2011)
 Songs From The Road (2013)
 Goin' to the Delta (2014)
 The Devil to Pay (2015)
 Still Live After 50 Years – Volume 1 (2015)
 Still Live After 50 Years – Volume 2 (2017)
 Witchy Feelin´ (2017)
 City Night (2019)
 Ain't Done Yet (2020)
 Taking the Blues Back Home (2020)
 Witchy Feelin (2022)
 Goin to the Delta (2019) (2022)
 Devil to Pay (2015) (2022)

Solo
 Solitaire (1997)
 Blues Like Midnight (2001)
 Struck by Lightning (2004)
 Out of the Blue (2008)
 Jazzin' on the Blues'' (2015)

References

External links

Savoy Brown website
 
 

1947 births
2022 deaths 
Deaths from colorectal cancer
20th-century Welsh male singers
21st-century Welsh male singers
Welsh rock singers
British blues singers
Welsh rock guitarists
British blues guitarists
Welsh record producers
Welsh singer-songwriters
Welsh rock musicians
Blues singer-songwriters
Electric blues musicians
Blues rock musicians
British blues (genre) musicians
British rhythm and blues boom musicians
Lead guitarists
People from Newbridge, Caerphilly
People from Rhyl
Decca Records artists
Deram Records artists
20th-century British guitarists
21st-century British guitarists
Savoy Brown members
British male singer-songwriters
Welsh expatriates in the United States